Ejner Federspiel (12 August 1896 – 21 November 1981) was a Danish film actor. He appeared in 58 films between 1934 and 1981. He was married to Gunver Fønss and his daughter was actress Birgitte Federspiel.

Partial filmography

 Hr. Tell og Søn (1930)
 7-9-13 (1934) - Dommer
 København, Kalundborg og - ? (1934) - Radiodirektør
 Jens Langkniv (1940) - Wolle Greiersen
 Familien Olsen (1940) - Nævningeleder
 Niels Pind og hans dreng (1941) - Ingeniør
 Tordenskjold går i land (1942)
 Søren Søndervold (1942) - Dommerfuldmægtig
 Forellen (1942) - Bibliotekar Konrad Isberg
 Alle mand paa dæk (1942) - Kontorchef Hansen
 Naar bønder elsker (1942) - Povl Hedemark
 Møllen (1943) - Smidt, pastoren
 Kriminalassistent Bloch (1943) - Carl Frank
 Jeg mødte en morder (1943) - Dr. Hennings
 De tre skolekammerater (1944) - Dommer Eyvind Carstens
 I gaar og i morgen (1945) - Civilingeniør Ove Humlegaard
 Hans store aften (1946) - Indehaver af lånekontor
 The Swedenhielm Family (1947) - Nielsen
 For frihed og ret (1949) - Christoffer Rasmussen
 The Red Horses (1950) - Anders Munk
 Min kone er uskyldig (1950) - Mand der ser på lejlighed
 Vesterhavsdrenge (1950) - Kræ Brejning
 Familien Schmidt (1951) - Pastoren
 Vejrhanen (1952) - Rektoren
 Vores lille by (1954) - Pastoren
 Ordet (1955) - Peter Petersen (uncredited)
 Seksdagesløbet (1958) - Tilskuer
 Harry and the Butler (1961) - Herskabstjener II
 The Counterfeit Traitor (1962) - Prof. Christiansen (uncredited)
 Den kære familie (1962) - Thomsen
 Der brænder en ild (1962) - Nisted
 Tine (1964) - Dr. Fangel
 Fem mand og Rosa (1964) - Pastoren
 Don Olsen kommer til byen (1964) - Borgmester
 Story of Barbara (1967) - Barbara's Father
 Brødrene på Uglegaarden (1967) - Christian Thorup
 The Olsen Gang (1968) - Konduktør
 Tænk på et tal (1969) - Borcks far
 The Man Who Thought Life (1969) - Butleren
 Revolution My A (1970) - Taxachauffør
 The Only Way (1970) - Arresteret jøde / Arrested jew
 Og så er der bal bagefter (1970) - Aage
 Christa (1971) - Consul Andersen
 Præsten i Vejlby (1972) - Hyrde
 The Olsen Gang Goes Crazy (1973) - Købmand Quist
 The Olsen Gang Sees Red (1976) - Joachim
 The Moelleby Affair (1976) - Assessor Godtfredsen
 The Olsen Gang Outta Sigh (1977) - Vagtmand
 Familien Gyldenkål vinder valget (1977)
 The Olsen Gang Goes to War (1978) - Nattevagt
 Rend mig i traditionerne (1979) - Jørgensen, patient
 The Olsen Gang Never Surrenders (1979) - Vagt
 Langturschauffør (1981) - Hans' far (final film role)

External links

1896 births
1981 deaths
Danish male film actors
People from Aarhus
20th-century Danish male actors